India competed at the 2018 Asian Games in Jakarta and Palembang, Indonesia, from 18 August to 2 September. Neeraj Chopra was the flag bearer for the opening ceremony while Rani Rampal was named as the flag bearer for the closing ceremony.

India bettered its previous best medal haul achieved 8 years earlier at the 2010 Asian Games in Guangzhou, China.

Competitors 
The following is a list of the number of competitors representing India in each sport at the Games:

Medalists  

| style="text-align:left; vertical-align:top;"|

|  style="text-align:left; vertical-align:top;"|

|

Firsts 

India secured a bronze medal in the men's team regu event which was the country's first medal in sepak takraw since the debut of the sport in the 1990 Asian Games.
 India secured its first ever medal in table tennis in the Asian Games as the men's team won a bronze medal by defeating Japan in the quarterfinal of the Table tennis at the 2018 Asian Games.
In the 25 meter rapid fire pistol event, Rahi Sarnobat became the first Indian woman to clinch the gold medal in a shooting event of Asian Games.
Vinesh Phogat, who won gold in the women's freestyle 50 kg category, became the first Indian woman wrestler to win a gold medal at the Games.
 Saina Nehwal won India's first ever medal in the women's singles event in badminton at the Asian Games when she won the bronze medal after losing the semi final.
 P. V. Sindhu became the first Indian shuttler to reach the final of a singles badminton event at the Games and eventually won a silver.
 Neeraj Chopra won the country's first javelin gold medal, setting a new national record.
 Indian pair of Pranab Bardhan & Shibnath Sarkar won the gold medal in the inaugural edition of Contract bridge at the 2018 Asian Games – Men's pair
Vikas Krishan Yadav sets the record to become the first Indian boxer to clinch a medal in three successive Asian games.
 Swapna Barman won gold medal in women's Heptathlon which is India's first ever medal in this kind.

Aquatics – Diving 

Men
The Swimming Federation of India (SFI) announced the Diving team for the Games as follows:

Aquatics – Swimming 

Men
The Swimming Federation of India (SFI) selected a 10-member swimming squad as follows for the Asian Games:

Archery 

Recurve

Individual

Team Event

Compound

Ranking Round

Elimination Round

Athletics 

Men

Track & road events

Field events

Women

Track & road events

Field events

Combined events – Heptathlon

Mixed

Badminton 

The Badminton Association of India (BAI) announced a 20-member squad for the Asian Games.

Singles

Doubles

Team

Basketball 

Summary

5x5 basketball
India women's team drawn in group X at the Games.

Women's tournament

Roster
The following is the India roster in the women's basketball tournament of the 2018 Asian Games.

Group X

Boxing 
 India's boxing campaign was pretty disappointing, as they failed to win a single medal in Women's boxing for the first time.
But in men's category they bettered the previous game's tally.
Indian boxer Amit Panghal defeated reigning Olympic champion & World Championship silver medalist Hasanboy Dusmatov to clinch the gold medal in Boxing at the 2018 Asian Games – Men's 49 kg

Boxer Vikas Krishnan become the first Indian boxer to win medals in three successive editions of the Boxing at the Asian Games

Men

Women

Bowling 

Men

Bridge 

The Bridge Federation of India picked a 24-member squad along with six reserves for the Asian Games.

Pairs

Team

Canoeing 

Slalom

Sprint

Traditional boat race

Cycling 

Track

Sprint

Pursuit

Keirin

Omnium

Equestrian 

Men

Eventing

Show jumping

 Reserve horse:Tethys De Beauval

Fencing 

Women

Field hockey 

India put up a men's and a women's team of a total of 32 athletes (16 men and 16 women).

Summary

Men's tournament

Squad

Pool A

Semifinal

Bronze medal game

Women's tournament

Squad

Pool B

Semifinal

Gold medal game

Golf 
The Indian Golf Union announced a team of seven members for the Jakarta Games.

Men

Women

Gymnastics 

Artistic

Men
Team Qualification & All-around Finals

Women
Team Qualification & All-around Finals

Team & Individual Finals

Handball 

India men's and women's team participate at the Games. The men's team entered in group D, and the women's team joined in group A.

Summary
Key:
 ET – After extra time
 P – Match decided by penalty-shootout.

Men's tournament

Roster

Atul Kumar
Deepak Ahlawat
Adithya Nagaraj
Harjinder Singh
Naveen Punia
Greenidge Dcunha
Navdeep
Karamjeet Singh
Avin Khatkar
Ramesh Chand
Sachin Kumar Bhardwaj
Kamaljeet Singh
Rahul Dubey
Harender Singh
Davinder Singh
Bajrang Thakur

Group D

Classification round – Group III

Women's tournament

Roster

Nina Shil
Nidhi Sharma
Maninder Kaur
Sanjeeta
Jyoti Shukla
Banita Sharma
Deepa
Ritu
Indu Gupta
Rimpi
Khila Devi
Diksha Kumari
Priyanka Thakur
KM Manjula Pathak

Group A

Ninth place game

Judo

Kabaddi 

India put up a 24-member squad (12 men +12 women) for Kabaddi.

Summary

Men's tournament

Roster

Monu Goyat
Rahul Chaudhari
Mohit Chillar
Ajay Thakur (captain)
Girish Maruti Ernak
Pardeep Narwal
Sandeep Narwal
Raju Lal Choudhary
Rishank Devadiga
Rohit Kumar
Deepak Niwas Hooda
Gangadhari Mallesh

Group A

Semifinal

Women's tournament

Roster

Sakshi Kumari
Kavita Thakur
Shalini Pathak
Randeep Kaur Khehra
Payel Chowdhury
Sonali Vishnu Shingate
Priyanka Negi
Ritu Negi
Sayali Sanjay Keripale
Usha Rani Narasimhaiah
Manpreet Kaur
Madhu Malviya

Group A

Semifinal

Final

Karate 

The Indian Karate team for the Asian Games 2018 is as follows:

Men

Martial arts – Kurash 

Men

Women

Martial arts – Pencak silat 

Men

Women

Martial arts – Wushu 

Sanda

Taolu

Roller sports – Speed skating

Rowing 

The Rowing Federation of India named the squad for the Asian Games to be held in August–September as follows:

Men

Women

Sailing

Sepak takraw 

Men

Women

Shooting 

The Indian squad for the Asian Games announced by the National Rifle Association of India is as follows:
Men

Women

Mixed

Sport climbing 

Speed

Combined

Squash 

The Squash Racquet Federation of India announced a team of the following 8 members for the games:
Men

Team

Table tennis 

The Table Tennis Federation of India (TTFI) announced the list of the following players for the Asian Games to be held in Jakarta, Indonesia:

Singles & Mixed Doubles

Team

Taekwondo

Tennis – Lawn tennis 
The All India Tennis Federation announced a 12-member team as follows:

Singles

Women

Tennis – Soft tennis 

Singles

Team

Volleyball

Indoor volleyball

Men's competition

Roster
The following is the India roster in the men's volleyball tournament of the 2019 Asian Games.

Head coach: Bir Yadav

Pool F

Playoff

7th–12th quarterfinal

11th place game

Women's competition

Roster
The following is the India roster in the women's volleyball tournament of the 2018 Asian Games.

Head coach: G.E. Sridharan

Pool B

11th place game

9th place game

Weightlifting 

Men

Wrestling 

Wrestling Federation of India announced the list of the following wrestlers for the Jakarta Games:

Men

Freestyle

Greco-Roman

Women

Freestyle

See also 
 India at the 2018 Asian Para Games

Notes

References 

Nations at the 2018 Asian Games
India at the Asian Games
2018 in Indian sport